Fukuno Station may refer to:
 Fukuno Station (Gifu), a railway station in Gifu Prefecture, Japan
 Fukuno Station (Toyama), a railway station in Toyama Prefecture, Japan